Bitinckë is a village in the Korçë County, Albania. At the 2015 local government reform it became part of the municipality Devoll. The village is at 700–1000 metres elevation above sea level.

Bitinckë is the site of an iron-nickel deposit located in one of three such zones in Albania. In addition, Bitinckë is the site of a nickel-silicate deposit, one of two in the country. The mined deposits are connected by a road to the national road (distance of 1 kilometre). The ores of nickel in the area have a thickness of 1–25 metres and contain sizable amounts of both iron and cobalt.

During the communist era, a farming cooperative existed in the village and Bitinckë was visited by Albanian president Enver Hoxha in 1957. Hoxha gave the village a camera to photograph their experiences of the cooperative farm.

Gallery

References

Populated places in Devoll (municipality)
Villages in Korçë County